Nim City is an unincorporated community in Richardson County, Nebraska, United States.

History
Nim City was platted in 1903 by Betsey U. Nims, and named for her.

References

Unincorporated communities in Richardson County, Nebraska
Unincorporated communities in Nebraska